The Charlotte Cobras were a member of the Major Indoor Lacrosse League (MILL). They were based at Independence Arena in Charlotte, North Carolina and only played during the 1996 season. In October 1995, the MILL announced that Charlotte had been awarded an expansion franchise to begin play for the 1996 season. After failing to win a single game for the season, the MILL folded the franchise in August 1996.

The name was later alluded to in the name of the Carolina Cobras, which played in the Arena Football League. There is a Charlotte Cobras playing as a works team of city public employees in the National Public Safety Football League.

Game log

References

Lacrosse clubs established in 1996
Lacrosse clubs disestablished in 1996
Lacrosse in Charlotte, North Carolina
Lacrosse teams in North Carolina
Major Indoor Lacrosse League teams
1996 establishments in North Carolina
1996 disestablishments in North Carolina
Sports teams in Charlotte, North Carolina